The North Carolina General Assembly of 1780-1781 was the fourth elected legislative body of the State of North Carolina.   The assembly consisted of a Senate and House of Commons that met in three sessions in at least two locations in the years 1780 and 1781. Each of the existing 50 North Carolina counties were authorized to elect one Senator and two members of the House of Commons.  In addition, six districts (also called boroughs) also elected one House member each.  The first two sessions were probably held in New Bern, North Carolina in April and September 1780. The third session met in Halifax from January 27, 1781 – February 13, 1781.

Governor and Councilors of State 

In 1780, the General Assembly elected Abner Nash as Governor of North Carolina, as was called for in the Constitution of North Carolina.  His term of office was extended by an act of the assembly until June 25, 1781.

The North Carolina Constitution of 1776 required "that the Senate and House of Commons, jointly, at their first meeting after each annual election, shall by ballot elect seven persons to be a Council of State for one year, who shall advise the Governor in the execution of his office."

The known North Carolina Council of State members elected by the General Assembly in 1780 included:
 Joseph Leech from Craven County
 James Davis
 Isaac Guion from Craven County
 James Granger

Leadership 

The House of Commons leadership included the following persons:
 Speaker: Thomas Benbury (Chowan County)
 Clerk: John Hunt

The Senate leadership included the following:
 Speaker: Alexander Martin (Guilford County) 
 Clerk: John Haywood (Edgecombe County)
 Assistant Clerk: Sherwood Haywood (Edgecombe County)

House and Senate members 

New counties created in 1779 included Franklin County, Gates County, Lincoln County, Montgomery County, Randolph County, Richmond County, Rutherford County, Warren County, and Wayne County.  Bute County and Tryon County were abolished in 1779.  There were no new counties created in 1780 or 1781.  There was at least a Senator or one Representative from each county and district.

Members of the General Assembly were allowed 55 dollars per day for attendance at sessions.

Notes

References

1780
General Assembly
General Assembly
 1780
 1780